A test strip is a band/piece/strip of paper or other material used for biological testing.

Specifically, test strip may refer to:

 Food testing strips
 Glucose meter test strip
 Lipolysis test strip
 Urine test strip

It may also refer to:
Teststrip, an art gallery in Auckland, New Zealand

See also
 
 
 Test (disambiguation)
 Strip (disambiguation)